Charles James Abbott (1815 – 6 January 1889) was an English solicitor and first-class cricketer.

Life
Abbott was the son of the solicitor Charles Thelwell Abbott (died 1853).  He was born at St Pancras, London, and educated at Winchester College.

Abbott was admitted a solicitor in 1841, and was for 48 years in practice, a partner in the firm of Abbott, Jenkins and Abbott, 8 New Inn, Strand, London. He died at Walton-on-Thames, Surrey on 6 January 1889. His son, William, played first-class cricket for Surrey County Cricket Club.

Cricketer
Abbott made a single first-class appearance for Surrey against the Marylebone Cricket Club at Lord's in 1844.  The Marylebone Cricket Club made 80 in their first-innings, with Surrey making 58 in response, during which Abbott scored 2 runs before he was dismissed by William Lillywhite.  The Marylebone Cricket Club made 52 in their second-innings, with Surrey chasing down their target of 75 with three wickets to spare.  Abbott wasn't required to bat in Surrey's second-innings.  Abbott's batting style is unknown.  This was his only major appearance for Surrey.

References

External links
Charles Abbott at ESPNcricinfo
Charles Abbott at CricketArchive

1815 births
1889 deaths
People from St Pancras, London
People educated at Winchester College
English solicitors
English cricketers
Surrey cricketers
19th-century English lawyers